The Actinomyces-1 RNA motif is a conserved RNA structure that was discovered by bioinformatics.
Actinomyces-1 motifs are found in the genus Actinomyces, in the phylum Actinomycetota.
Actinomyces-1 RNAs likely function in trans as sRNAs.
In terms of their secondary structure, Actinomyces-1 RNAs consist of a multistem junction with many conserved GA dinucleotides.

Actinomyces-1 RNAs contain a predicted kink turn.  This particular example of a kink turn was studied to better understand how kink turn structures relate to their sequences.

References

Non-coding RNA